The 1966–67 season was the 56th season in Hajduk Split’s history and their 21st in the Yugoslav First League. Their 13th place finish in the 1965–66 season meant it was their 21st successive season playing in the Yugoslav First League.

Competitions

Overall

Yugoslav First League

Classification

Matches

Yugoslav First League

Sources: hajduk.hr

Yugoslav Cup

Sources: hajduk.hr

Player seasonal records

Top scorers

Source: Competitive matches

See also
1966–67 Yugoslav First League
1966–67 Yugoslav Cup

External sources
 1966–67 Yugoslav First League at rsssf.com
 1966–67 Yugoslav Cup at rsssf.com

HNK Hajduk Split seasons
Hajduk Split